Peggy O'Neal is an American voice actress.

Career
O'Neal began acting in three episodes of seaQuest DSV, and went on to do ADR on Dawson's Creek, Dark Skies, Walker, Texas Ranger.  Through acting classes taught by Susan Blu, O'Neal got in contact with Paul Di Franco, a casting agent for Saban Entertainment.  O'Neal's roles at Saban Entertainment included Shinzo character Yakumo Tatsuro.

In addition to voice acting, O'Neal works as a part-time teacher for acting classes at Moorpark College.

Filmography

Anime

Film

Video games

Other dubbing

References

External links
 
 

American voice actresses
Living people
Place of birth missing (living people)
Year of birth missing (living people)
21st-century American actresses